Sushanth Reddy is an Indian film director, writer and producer who predominantly works in Telugu cinema.

Career 
Sushanth Reddy began his journey as an assistant director with 2010 Telugu film Inkosaari and made his directorial debut in 2015 with Superstar Kidnap which he also co-produced. His next directorial Dear Megha released in September 2021. He's currently co-producing Maate Mantramu starring Rahul Vijay and Megha Akash.

Filmography

Director

Producer

Other roles

References

External links 

 

Indian film directors
Living people
Telugu film directors
21st-century Indian film directors
Film directors from Telangana
1986 births